M. Dean Kreps (born December 13, 1961) is a former American football player and coach.  He served as the head football coach at Hope College, in Holland, Michigan, from 1995 to 2015, compiling a record of 109–97.  Kreps guided the Flying Dutchmen to six Michigan Intercollegiate Athletic Association championships.

Head coaching record

References

1961 births
Living people
Hope Flying Dutchmen football coaches
Illinois Fighting Illini football coaches
Monmouth Fighting Scots football players